
Year 412 BC was a year of the pre-Julian Roman calendar. At the time, it was known as the Year of the Consulship of Ambustus and Pacilus (or, less frequently, year 342 Ab urbe condita). The denomination 412 BC for this year has been used since the early medieval period, when the Anno Domini calendar era became the prevalent method in Europe for naming years.

Events 
 By place 
 Persian Empire 
 The Persians under Darius II see their opportunity to play off one Greek city-state against another and to recover control of the Greek cities of Asia Minor, which have been under Athenian control since 449 BC. The satraps of Asia Minor, Tissaphernes and Pharnabazus, are ordered to collect overdue tribute.
 The Spartans sign a treaty of mutual help with the Persian satrap of Lower Asia, Tissaphernes. By the treaty of Miletus, Persia is given complete freedom in western Asia Minor in return for agreeing to pay for seamen to man the Peloponnesian fleet.

 Greece 
 Alcibiades helps stir up revolts amongst Athens' allies in Ionia, on the west coast of Asia Minor. However, Alcibiades loses the confidence of the Spartans and antagonises their king Agis II. As a result, he flees to the court of the Persian satrap Tissaphernes. Alcibiades advises Tissaphernes to withdraw his support from Sparta while conspiring with the oligarchic party in Athens, as Sparta's allied cities break away in a series of revolts.
 The Athenians vote to use their last reserves to build a new fleet.
 Clazomenae revolts against Athens. After a brief resistance, however, it again acknowledges the Athenian supremacy.
 An epidemic of an unknown disease hits Northern Greece.

 Rome 
 The epidemic hits the Roman Republic and causes a food shortage.

Births

Deaths

References